The Kenyan County Champions League is the fifth tier of the Kenyan football league system. It has a promotion and relegation system with the Kenyan Regional Leagues and the Kenyan Sub-County Leagues. Member clubs are amateur.

The league was formed on 10 July 2013 in line with the introduction of a new six-tier system by the Football Kenya Federation to take effect from the beginning of the 2014 season.

See also
 Kenyan football league system

References

5